Election Systems & Software (ES&S) is an Omaha, Nebraska-based company that manufactures and sells voting machine equipment and services. The company's offerings include vote tabulators, direct-recording electronic (DRE) machines, voter registration and election management systems, ballot-marking devices, electronic poll books, Ballot on Demand printing services, and absentee voting-by-mail services.

ES&S is a subsidiary of McCarthy Group, LLC. In 2014, ES&S was the largest manufacturer of voting machines in the United States, claiming customers in 4,500 localities in 42 states and two U.S. territories. As of 2014, the company had more than 450 employees, more than 200 of whom are located in Omaha.

In 2014, ES&S claimed that "in the past decade alone," it had installed more than 260,000 voting systems, more than 15,000 electronic poll books, provided services to more than 75,000 elections. The company has installed statewide voting systems in Alabama, Arkansas, Delaware, Georgia, Idaho, Iowa, Maine, Maryland, Minnesota, Mississippi, Montana, Nebraska, New Mexico, North Carolina, North Dakota, Rhode Island, South Carolina, South Dakota, Virginia, and West Virginia. As of 2019 ES&S claimed a U.S. market share of more than 60 percent in customer voting system installations.

The company maintains 10 facilities in the United States, two field offices in Canada (Pickering, Ontario; and Vancouver, British Columbia) and a warehouse in Jackson, Mississippi.

History

Corporate Ancestors

American Information Systems
In October 1974, Robert J. Urosevich of the Klopp Printing Company of Omaha approached Westinghouse Learning Corporation (a subsidiary of Westinghouse Corporation) with a simple question:  Could the scanners Westinghouse was building for educational tests be used to scan ballots?  This led Westinghouse to briefly enter the ballot scanning business, and Robert Urosevich and his brother Tod, a former IBM salesman, formed Data Mark Systems to sell and service Westinghouse vote tabulation equipment.  Data Mark and Westinghouse ballot tabulation equipment saw limited success through the late 1970s.
As Westinghouse withdrew from the voting business, the Urosevich brothers and several former Westinghouse employees founded a new company in August 1979, American Information Systems.  AIS came out with a line of central-count ballot scanners that entered the marketplace in 1982.

Business Records Corporation
The first precinct-count ballot scanner was the Gyrex MTB-1, which came to market around 1974.  The MTB-1 evolved into the MTB-2 while corporate ownership shifted from Gyrex Corporation to Valtec, in 1977, to Major Data Concepts, in 1979.  Computer Election Systems Incorporated (CESI), a manufacturer of Votomatic punched-card voting equipment, marketed the MTB-2 as the Tally-II scanner in the early 1980s, pairing it with its own Precinct-Ballot-Conut punched-card ballot reader, the PBC.

CESI developed its own family of precinct-count and later central-count scanners, under the Optech brand name.  The Optech I precinct-count scanner came to market in 1983, and saw successful use in several states.  Cronus Industries, Inc., a Texas company, purchased CESI in 1985 and merged it with their ballot printing subsidiary, Business Records Corporation (BRC).

Election Products Inc.
Election Products Inc. was a small Virginia-based election service company.  In the early 1990s, the company contracted with ILJ Corporation of Richmond, Virginia, to develop a DRE voting machine that would be marketed as the Votronic (unrelated to an earlier ballot scanner that was marketed under the same name in the 1960s).  This voting machine had a flat panel liquid crystal display and a touchscreen, and was not much bigger than the laptop computers of its time.  The Votronic saw its first use in the 1996 primary season; one commentator said it resembled a large Magna Doodle.

Automark Technical Systems LLC
 
In 2003, Eugene Cummings filed a patent for a ballot marking device specifically designed to provide an accessible voting interface for optical-scan voting systems.
Cummings, along with Joseph Vaneck founded Automark Technical Systems LLC to develop and manufacture the machine.  Prior to the availability of this machine, the Help America Vote Act of 2002 effectively required jurisdictions in the United States that used optical scan systems to install at least one DRE voting machine in each polling place.

Mergers and Antitrust Actions
American Information Systems acquired the Election Services Division of Business Records Corporation and was reincorporated as Election Systems & Software, Inc. in December 1997.  At the time, AIS had about 750 customers and BRC had around 1200, where each customer was typically a county election office.  As a result of this merger, ES&S became the largest voting system vendor in the United States.  This merger was delayed by the United States Department of Justice on antitrust grounds until ES&S agreed to transfer the Optech product line to Sequoia Voting Systems, while retaining the right to sell and service Optech products to its existing customers.

Shortly after the BRC-AIS merger, ES&S acquired the rights to the Votronic.  They immediately made major cosmetic changes to the Votronic, renaming it the iVotronic.  In their sales presentations, ES&S emphasized that the iVotronic was essentially the same machine as the Votronic except for features added to bring it into compliance with the Americans with Disabilities Act of 1990.

ES&S was one of the top four providers of voting equipment used in the November 2004 election. The other three were Diebold Election Systems,   Sequoia Voting Systems and Hart InterCivic.

ES&S acquired AutoMARK Technical Systems on January 28, 2008.
Under ES&S, the AutoMark came into widespread use.  By 2016, it was used statewide in 10 states, and widely used in 19 additional states.

ES&S acquired Premier Election Solutions (formerly known as Diebold Election Systems) on September 3, 2009. Following the acquisition, the Department of Justice and 14 individual states launched investigations into the transaction on antitrust grounds. In March 2010, the Department of Justice filed a civil antitrust lawsuit against ES&S, requiring it to divest voting equipment systems assets it purchased in September 2009 from Premier Election Solutions in order to restore competition. The company later sold the assets to Dominion Voting Systems.

Recent ownership
In June 2019, ES&S was wholly owned by "Government Systems, Software & Services, Inc," of which "McCarthy Group. LLC" held a controlling ownership, and shares over 5% each were held by Tom Burt and Tom O'Brien. Shares over 5% of McCarthy Group in turn were owned by passive investors Nancy McCarthy and Kenneth Stinson.
Burt is president/CEO of ES&S, and O'Brien is vice president/CFO.

Controversies

Certification of Voting Systems
In May 2013, the Election Assistance Commission certified ES&S' EVS 5.0 election management system  as meeting the commission's 2005 Voluntary Voting Systems Guidelines (VVSG). Products included in EVS 5.0 are ES&S' DS200 and DS850 vote tabulators.

EVS 5.0 also saw enhancements to the company's AutoMARK software, which is designed to be compliant with the federal Americans with Disabilities Act of 1990 for allowing voters with disabilities to cast ballots. In October 2012, the EAC certified ES&S' Unity 3.4.0.0 election management software.

In June 2014, the Virginia Board of Elections certified EVS 5201, the first state to certify an election management system that features the ExpressVote Universal Voting System. This election system combines paper-based voting with touch screen technology that's designed to serve every eligible voter, including those with disabilities.

After EVS 5201 was certified, Fairfax County, Virginia, purchased the ExpressVote Universal Voting System in June. The county intends to use the system for the first time for the November 2014 general election.

Electronic Poll Books for the City of Chicago
In January 2014, the City of Chicago reached an agreement with ES&S to provide more than 2,100 ExpressPoll voter check-in and verification devices to support the city's 1.6 million registered voters. The electronic poll books were first used in Chicago's 2014 primary elections.

Withdrawal and Reinstatement of InkaVote

On August 3, 2007, California Secretary of state Debra Bowen withdrew approval of the ES&S InkaVote Plus after announcing a "top-to-bottom review" of the voting machines certified for use in California in March 2007.
However, the InkaVote Plus was never included in the review process conducted by Bowen's office. Bowen then approved InkaVote Plus for use by Los Angeles County and the City of Los Angeles on January 2, 2008.

Oakland County, Michigan

Early voters in the 2008 Presidential election reported instances of malfunctioning machines. People complained that they voted for one candidate, only to have their selection switch to another. The clerk of Oakland County, Michigan reported inconsistent results with some machines during testing in October.

For the 2012 elections, ES&S added wireless modem technology so officials could make secure reports via cell phones. This upgrade was designed to improve the transparency and accuracy of Oakland County's election night reporting. The wireless technology used by Oakland County was tested by a federally accredited Voting System Test Laboratory and subsequently tested and approved by the State of Michigan for pilot usage in the November 2012 presidential election.

Reported problems during the 2010 election
On April 14, 2010, the Cleveland Plain Dealer reported that “About 10 percent of Cuyahoga County’s voting machines … [had] failed a pre-election test.” After 20 months of investigating the DS200 Precinct Count Optical Scanner in the EAC-certified Unity 3.2.0.0 voting system, on December 22, 2011, the Election Assistance Commission recommended decertification of the ES&S voting machine if it cannot be fixed. From the findings:
“The DS200 accepts a voted ballot but does not record the ballot on its internal counter. In addition the marks of the second ballot are not recorded.”
“When a 17” ballot was inserted at an angle, the DS200 did not consistently count the mark properly. The mark registered either as a different selection than intended or did not register at all.”
The system randomly freezes and does not record the freeze in its log files. There are other events not logged, such as touch screen calibration.

In May 2013, however, the Election Assistance Commission certified the DS200 as part of ES&S' EVS 5.0 election management system as meeting its 2005 Voluntary Voting Systems Guidelines (VVSG). Image of EAC certificate

Remote Access Controversy
In a February 2018 article in The New York Times, reporter Kim Zetter reported that remote-access software had been found on an election management computer system used in Pennsylvania, and quoted unnamed sources saying "ES&S has in the past sometimes sold its election-management system with remote-access software preinstalled," and that this was used by ES&S technicians to remotely access the systems via modem to troubleshoot and provide maintenance to systems they sold.  She also included a response from the company denying this, stating “None of the employees… including long-tenured employees, has any knowledge that our voting systems have ever been sold with remote-access software.”

In a letter sent to Senator Ron Wyden in April 2018, Election Systems & Software made the disclosure that in fact "some" of the election management systems that they sold for voting did have remote-access software installed. This disclosure was made public in July 2018.  The letter to Wyden had been in response to a question from the senator requesting clarification of the information on remote-access software in the New York Times article.

While election-management systems are not the voting machines voters use to cast their ballots, they are used to program the voting machines used in a county and to count and tabulate the results from the voting machines. By installing remote access software allowing the machines to be accessed via the internet, the machines are vulnerable to being "hacked" remotely, allowing the counting to be altered surreptitiously, or malware to be installed to affect an election result. Motherboard, the site that originally published the story, called the remote access software installation "the worst decision for security short of leaving ballot boxes on a Moscow street corner."

According to the April letter, ES&S claims to have stopped installing the remote-access software in December 2007, in response to standards adopted by the U.S. Election Assistance Commission.

Johnson County, Indiana 
On election day November 6, 2018, thousands of voters in Johnson County, Indiana had to wait in line for hours as technical glitches and computer crashes caused issues throughout the county. A preliminary report prepared for the Indiana Secretary of State by Ball State's Voting System Technical Oversight Program, or VSTOP, examined all of the things that went wrong on election day. In this preliminary report the investigators concluded that ES&S failed to report several "anomalies" that occurred prior to election day, which violates Indiana election law.

Operating Software Vulnerabilities 
In a July 13, 2019 article, Associated Press reporter Tami Abdollah reported that "the vast majority of 10,000 election jurisdictions nationwide use Windows 7 or an older operating system to create ballots, program voting machines, tally votes and report counts."   Windows 7 reaches its "end of life" on January 14, 2020, meaning that Microsoft will stop providing technical support such as patches to fix software vulnerabilities.  For jurisdictions that have already purchased systems running on Windows 7, ES&S said it will be working with Microsoft to provide support until jurisdictions can update. Windows 10 came out in 2015. Though ES&S is testing a new system it's unclear how long it will take to complete the process — federal and possible state recertification, plus rolling out updates — and if it will be done before primaries begin in February. Kevin Skoglund, chief technologist for Citizens for Better Elections, said county election officials point to Election Assistance Commission and state certifications as “rock-solid proof” their systems are secure, but don't realize vendors are certifying systems under 2005 standards.

See also
Election security
Electronic voting
Voting machine
List of electronic voting machines in New York state

References

External links
ES&S Website
McCarthy Group website.

Election technology companies
Companies based in Omaha, Nebraska
Electronic voting companies